Limits to arbitrage is a theory in financial economics that, due to restrictions that are placed on funds that would ordinarily be used by rational traders to arbitrage away pricing inefficiencies, prices may remain in a non-equilibrium state for protracted periods of time.

The efficient-market hypothesis assumes that whenever mispricing of a publicly traded stock occurs, an opportunity for low-risk profit is created for rational traders.  The low-risk profit opportunity exists through the tool of arbitrage, which, briefly, is buying and selling differently priced items of the same value, and pocketing the difference.  If a stock falls away from its equilibrium price (let us say it becomes undervalued) due to irrational trading (noise traders), rational investors will (in this case) take a long position while going short a proxy security, or another stock with similar characteristics.

Rational traders usually work for professional money management firms, and invest other peoples' money.  If they engage in arbitrage in reaction to a stock mispricing, and the mispricing persists for an extended period, clients of the money management firm can (and do) formulate the opinion that the firm is incompetent.  This results in withdrawal of the clients' funds.  In order to deliver funds, the manager must unwind the position at a loss.  The threat of this action on behalf of clients causes professional managers to be less vigilant to take advantage of these opportunities.  This has the tendency to exacerbate the problem of pricing inefficiency.

In perhaps the best known example, the American firm Long-Term Capital Management (LTCM) fell victim to limits-to-arbitrage, in 1998. The company had staked its investments on the convergence of the prices of certain bonds. These bond prices were guaranteed to converge in the long run. However, in the short run, due to the East Asian financial crisis and the Russian government's debt default, panicked investors traded against LTCM's position, and so the prices that had been expected to converge were, instead, driven further apart. This caused LTCM to face margin calls. Because the firm did not have enough money to cover these calls, they were compelled to close out their positions and to take great losses; whereas, if they had held their positions, they then could have made significant profits.

See also
 Arbitrage#Dual-listed companies

References

Further reading
 Inefficient Markets: An Introduction to Behavioral Finance, Andrei Shleifer, 2000, Oxford University Press.
 Andrei Shleifer and Robert W. Vishny, 1997, 'The Limits of Arbitrage', The Journal of Finance, American Finance Association
 Gromb, Denis, and Dimitri Vayanos, 2002, Equilibrium and welfare in markets with financially constrained arbitrageurs, Journal of Financial Economics 66, 361–407.
 Gromb, Denis, and Dimitri Vayanos, 2010, Limits of Arbitrage: The State of the Theory, the Annual Review of Financial Economics, forthcoming.
 Kondor, Peter, 2009. Risk in Dynamic Arbitrage: Price Effects of Convergence Trading, Journal of Finance 64(2), April 2009
 Xiong, Wei, 2001, Convergence trading with wealth effects, Journal of Financial Economics 62, 247–292.

Arbitrage
Financial economics
Financial markets